Aimé Bergeal (1912-1973) was a French politician. He served as a member of the French Senate from 1967 to 1973, representing Seine-et-Oise. The Stade Aimé Bergeal in Mantes-la-Ville was named in his memory.

References

1910s births
1967 deaths
People from Tarn (department)
French Section of the Workers' International politicians
Socialist Party (France) politicians
French Senators of the Fifth Republic
Senators of Seine-et-Oise
Senators of Yvelines
Workers' Force members